Jiří Svoboda (born 19 April 1941) is a Czech former volleyball player who competed for Czechoslovakia in the 1968 Summer Olympics.

He was born in Zubří.

In 1968 he was part of the Czechoslovak team which won the bronze medal in the Olympic tournament. He played all nine matches.

External links
 profile

1941 births
Living people
People from Zubří
Czech men's volleyball players
Czechoslovak men's volleyball players
Olympic volleyball players of Czechoslovakia
Volleyball players at the 1968 Summer Olympics
Olympic bronze medalists for Czechoslovakia
Olympic medalists in volleyball
Medalists at the 1968 Summer Olympics
Sportspeople from the Zlín Region